Bernard Van Rysselberghe (5 October 1905 – 25 September 1984) was a Belgian professional road bicycle racer. Van Rysselberghe won one stage in the 1929 Tour de France, and was the winner of the 1931 edition of Bordeaux–Paris.

Van Rysselberghe was born in Laarne, Belgium and died in Damme,  Belgium as the age of 78.

Major results
Van Rysselberghe won the following races during his career.

1929
GP de la Meuse
Tour de France: Stage 18
1931
Bordeaux–Paris

External links

Official Tour de France results for Bernard van Rysselberghe

Belgian male cyclists
1905 births
1984 deaths
Belgian Tour de France stage winners
Cyclists from East Flanders
People from Laarne